Dr. Lisa Urkevich is a specialist in music and heritage of Saudi Arabia, Kuwait, and the greater Arabian Peninsula, and has undertaken extensive additional scholarship on Northern European Renaissance music. She has served as a strategist and senior advisor on international enterprises. She is former professor of musicology and ethnomusicology, and founding division head (dean) of the arts and humanities, and founding chair of the music and drama department at the American University of Kuwait (2004-2022). Previously, she was a full-time professor at Boston University. Since 2017 she has been the general editor of Symposium: Journal of the College Music Society, the largest consortium of college, conservatory, university, and independent musicians and scholars. Urkevich is a two-time Senior Fulbright Scholar, the recipient of the 2015 University of Maryland Alumna of the Year Award, a Harvard University Fellow, and the author of numerous publications including the "pioneering work," Music and Traditions of the Arabian Peninsula: Saudi Arabia, Kuwait, Bahrain, and Qatar (Routledge, 2015).

Education 
Urkevich holds four American degrees: PhD in musicology/ethnomusicology from the University of Maryland (1997), Master's of Music in musicology from Florida State University (1990), Bachelor's of Science in music education from Towson University (1988), and under the direction of Mantle Hood (one of the founders of ethnomusicology), as well as Josef Pacholczyk and David Mingyue Liang, she earned a Bachelor's of Arts in ethnomusicology from the University of Maryland, Baltimore County (1986).

Career 
Urkevich has been a visiting professor at Bucknell University, the University of Maryland, Millersville University, and a full-time professor at Boston University where she held a joint faculty position in the College of Fine Arts, the College of Arts and Sciences, and the Graduate School of Arts and Sciences. She initially moved to Kuwait in 2003 as a US senior Fulbright scholar, after which she was invited to help lead the newly opened American University of Kuwait. She served as its first division head of arts and humanities and played a pivotal role in establishing the new college. While in Kuwait, for seven years she was the director of a regional heritage center, the Arabian Heritage Project, that fostered festivals, exhibits, lectures, competitions, performances, and supported research and documentation along with a variety of intangible heritage endeavors. Through the center, she created and led the Al-Koot Festival, which celebrated regional traditions.

Throughout her career, Urkevich has served as a strategist and senior advisor to governments, corporations, consultancies, and universities. She remains active in music, higher education, performing arts, and heritage societies and conferences around the world.

Research and scholarship 

For 30 years Urkevich undertook research and fieldwork throughout the Arabian Peninsula, beginning when she resided in an array of Saudi regions from 1994-1998, a time when Saudi Arabia was considered among the most closed countries in the world and many locals viewed music as haraam, i.e., sinful. Before 2018, women could not drive, and in previous decades their activities were restricted, and they were always required to be escorted by a male "guardian." Such adversity made research all the more challenging, but Urkevich uniquely managed to investigate the music and traditions of a variety of diverse peoples across the vast region, covering thousands of kilometers Throughout the years, she engaged in rare investigation of the musical worlds of both men and women, the wealthy and disadvantaged, badu-hadhar (bedouin and settled), those from mountains, villages, deserts, and cities. Based on her research and writings, she developed unique courses on Arabian Peninsula music, and regularly teaches and lectures on Arab as well as western music.

Among her many publications, Urkevich is the author of Kuwait: Sea Songs of the Arabian Gulf, "a rigorous work and valuable contribution,"  and Music and Traditions of the Arabian Peninsula, "the most comprehensive [music] book anywhere in the Middle East and North Africa".

Urkevich is also well known for her work on Renaissance music. For four years she was the director of the Boston University Collegium Musicum Early Music Ensemble, and the group performed her transcriptions of the Anne Boleyn Music Book, perhaps the first performance of the pieces in over 500 years. As a musicologists she debunked the hypothesis, suggested by Edward Lowinsky, that the so-called Anne Boleyn Music Book MS 1070 of the Royal College of Music] was prepared in England in the 1530s for Anne Boleyn [Lowinsky, "A Music Book for Anne Boleyn," in Florilegium historiale ... 1971]. Urkevich's research asserts that Boleyn owned the book and likely performed from it, but that it was not commissioned for her and instead was given to her while she was a girl in France."Urkevich presents a compelling narrative (and in many ways more interesting than Lowinsky's) that proposes, on paleographical and reportorial evidence, that the motet book was prepared in France ca. 1505–09, and was owned and prepared for a woman, possibly Marguerite d'Angouleme (sister of Francis I), or her mother, Louise of Savoy, and given to Anne, while she was in their service in France as a young girl. ...Urkevich's dating of the manuscript is convincing. [On her suggested provenance]...I find the many connections intriguing...."Urkevich also re-established the provenance of the important music manuscript London, British Library, Ms. Royal 20 A. XVI, proving that it was prepared for Anne de Beaujeu (Anne of France) and her husband Pierre de Bourbon around 1488 when they gained their positions as duke and duchess of Bourbon—and was not prepared for Louis d'Orléans and Anne of Brittany as was previously purported.

Selected publications
 Music and Traditions of the Arabian Peninsula: Saudi Arabia, Kuwait, Bahrain, and Qatar. New York/London: Routledge, 2015 
 Kuwait: Sea Songs of the Arabian Gulf: Hamid Bin Hussein Sea Band. CD and Booklet issued separately. MCM 3051. Barre, VT: Multicultural Media, 2014 
 "Anne Boleyn's French Motet Book: A Childhood Gift," in Ars musica septentrionalis. Eds. Frédéric Billiet and Barbara Haggh. Paris: Presses de l'université Paris-Sorbonne (PUPS), 95-120, 2011.
 "The Wings of the Bourbon: The Early Provenance of the Chansonnier London, British Library, Ms. Royal 20 A. XVI," Journal of the Alamire Foundation Vol. 4/1 (2012): 91-113.

References

Academic staff of the American University of Kuwait
Living people
University of Maryland, College Park alumni
Year of birth missing (living people)
American music educators